The Time Machine Tour was a concert tour by the Canadian rock band Rush that began on June 29, 2010 in Albuquerque, New Mexico and ended July 2, 2011 at The Gorge Amphitheatre in George, Washington. The tour was notable for featuring the album Moving Pictures played in its entirety for the first time live, as well as material from the band's then upcoming studio album Clockwork Angels (i.e. the songs "Caravan" and "BU2B", which had been released as a single in early June 2010). This tour is one of three where the setlist has been consistent throughout the entire tour, the others being the 1987 Hold Your Fire tour and the 2004 R30: 30th Anniversary Tour. This is also the first Rush tour to not include any songs from Roll The Bones in the set list since that album was released in 1991. 

As a tribute to the city that first played their music on the radio, the Cleveland performance at Quicken Loans Arena on April 15, 2011 was recorded/filmed and released as a DVD, Blu-ray, and double CD titled Time Machine 2011: Live in Cleveland. This is the first official full-length live performance filming of Rush in the United States.

Set list
Set 1
"The Spirit of Radio"
"Time Stand Still"
"Presto"
"Stick It Out"
"Workin' Them Angels"
"Leave That Thing Alone"
"Faithless"
"BU2B"
"Freewill"
"Marathon"
"Subdivisions"

Set 2

"Tom Sawyer"
"Red Barchetta"
"YYZ"
"Limelight"
"The Camera Eye" 
"Witch Hunt"
"Vital Signs"
"Caravan"
"Moto Perpetuo/Love for Sale" (Neil Peart drum solo)
"O'Malley's Break" (Twelve-string guitar solo)
"Closer to the Heart"
"2112"I: "Overture"II: "The Temples of Syrinx"
"Far Cry"

Encore:

 "La Villa Strangiato" (with polka intro)
 "Working Man" (with reggae intro and "Cygnus X-1: Book I" outro)

Post Show:

Post-show video depicting the characters Peter Klaven and Sydney Fife (played respectively by Paul Rudd and Jason Segel) from the 2009 film I Love You, Man annoying the band members after the gig.

Tour dates

Cancellations/postponements
The show on July 7, 2010 in Chicago at the Charter One Pavilion was postponed due to inclement weather. It was rescheduled for August 23, 2010.  Fans attending the August 23, 2010 makeup show received an embroidered Rush baseball cap with "The Rain Date – Chicago 2010" on the back.  Prior to kicking off the second leg of the tour, the band announced that they would be postponing the April 1, 2011 Greensboro, North Carolina show a day later and as a result, they would move the April 6, 2011 show in Toledo, Ohio to April 13, 2011.

References

Bibliography
 Daly and Hansen. Rush: Wandering the Face of the Earth: The Official Touring History. Insight Editions, 2019. 

http://www.hennemusic.com/2011/10/video-first-look-at-new-rush-live-dvd.html

Rush (band) concert tours
2010 concert tours
2011 concert tours
Concerts at Malmö Arena